Lee Si-chen (born 13 August 1952 in Gangshan, Kaohsiung, Taiwan), is a Taiwanese engineer specializing in semiconductors, a researcher in amorphous silicon in the early development in Taiwan, and an IEEE Fellow. He has been a professor of electrical engineering since 1982 and the president of National Taiwan University from 2005 to 2013.

Biography

Education
He received a bachelor's degree in electrical engineering from National Taiwan University (1974) and a master's degree (1977) and PhD (1981), both in electrical engineering, from Stanford University.

Present positions
He is the current president of National Taiwan University (2005 – ), president of the Association of National Universities of Taiwan (2006 – ) and chair of the University Mobility in Asia and the Pacific (2005 – ). He is also a professor of electrical engineering at the National Taiwan University (1985 - ).

Experiences and Trainings
 IEEE Fellow (2002)
 Dean of academic affairs, National Taiwan University (1996–2002)
 Assistant to the Minister of National Defense (1993–1994)
 Director, Department of Electrical Engineering, National Taiwan University (1989–1992)
 Vice Directorate, IEEE Taipei section (2001–2002)
 Directorate, Chinese Association of Electromagnetism in Life Science (1999–2004)
 Associate editor, Materials Chemistry and Physics (1992–2004)
 Associate professor, Department of Electrical Engineering, National Taiwan University (1982–1985)
 Researcher, Energy Conversion Devices, Inc., Troy, Michigan (1980–1982)
 Associate editor, Journal of Chinese Engineers (1996–2000)
 Leader, Bioenergy Field Group, Biology Department, National Science Council (1992–1998)
 Directorate, Association of Chinese Electrical Engineers (1992–1994)
 Leader, Microelectronics Group, Engineering Department, National Science Council (1988–1993)
 Consultant, ERSO of ITRI (1991–1992 and 1986–1989)

Awards
 The Degree of Doctor Honoris Causa Conferred by Kansai University (2005)
 Institute of Electrical and Electronics Engineers 47th Academic Award of Ministry of Education (2003)
 Annual Medal from Chinese Association of Electrical Engineers (2002)
 IEEE Fellow (2002)
 IEEE Third Millennium Medal for outstanding achievements and contributions on electronic devices (2000)
 Member of Asia-Pacific Academy of Materials (1997)
 Special contracted researcher of National Science Council (1996–2002)
 Outstanding Research Awards of National Science Council (1986–1996)
 Young Distinguished Engineer of Chinese Engineer Association (1987)
 Sun Yat-Sen Academic Award (Engineering) (1987)

Interest in Psychic Abilities
He is interested in the scientific research of Chinese Qigong and extrasensory perception.

References

National Taiwan University alumni
Fellow Members of the IEEE
Academic staff of the National Taiwan University
Taiwanese electrical engineers
Living people
1952 births
Scientists from Kaohsiung
Presidents of National Taiwan University